Kangur is a common Estonian surname (meaning weaver), and may refer to:
Guido Kangur (born 1956), actor
Jüri-Ruut Kangur (born 1975), conductor
Kalju Kangur (1925-1989), writer and translator
Kristjan Kangur (born 1982), basketball player
Ksenja Kangur (1904–2010), centenarian (:et)
Külli Kangur (born 1949), zoologist and hydrobiologist (:et)
Mart Kangur (born 1971), Estonian poet, translator and philosopher
Villu Kangur (born 1957), actor and translator

See also
Kangro (disambiguation)
Kangru (disambiguation)

Estonian-language surnames
Occupational surnames